Huang Nianlai (November 1939 – 18 September 2022) was a Chinese mycologist and politician. A member of the Chinese Communist Party, he served in the National People's Congress from 1983 to 1993.

Huang died in Sanming on 18 September 2022, at the age of 82.

References

1939 births
2022 deaths
Chinese mycologists
Chinese Communist Party politicians from Fujian
Delegates to the National People's Congress from Fujian
Delegates to the 6th National People's Congress
Delegates to the 7th National People's Congress
Fujian Normal University alumni